Higher, Higher may refer to:

 "Higher, Higher", a song by Justin Timberlake from Man of the Woods, 2018
 "Higher, Higher", a song by Maki Ohguro, 2016
 Higher! Higher!, a baby book by Leslie Patricelli

See also
 Higher and Higher (disambiguation)